John Barry Pierce (13 August 1934 – 7 August 2020), known as Barry Pierce, was an English professional footballer who played as an inside forward in the Football League for Crystal Palace, Millwall, York City and Exeter City, in non-League football for Truro City and Salisbury City, and was on the books of Everton and Stockport County without making a league appearance.

References

1934 births
Living people
Footballers from Liverpool
English footballers
Association football forwards
Everton F.C. players
Stockport County F.C. players
Truro City F.C. players
Crystal Palace F.C. players
Millwall F.C. players
York City F.C. players
Exeter City F.C. players
Salisbury City F.C. players
English Football League players